Notre-Dame-du-Bon-Conseil, Quebec may refer to any of two entities in Drummond Regional County Municipality, Quebec

Notre-Dame-du-Bon-Conseil, Quebec (village)
Notre-Dame-du-Bon-Conseil, Quebec (parish)